Pendleton is both a surname and a given name. Notable people with the name include:

Surname:
 Alexander Sandie Pendleton (1840–1864), Confederate staff officer serving Thomas 'Stonewall' Jackson
Austin Pendleton, (born 1940), American film, television, and stage actor
Brian Pendleton (1944–2001), guitarist with British group The Pretty Things in the 1960s
Charles F. Pendleton (1931–1953), soldier, Medal of Honor recipient in US Army during the Korean War
Chris Pendleton (born 1982), American amateur wrestler, winner of the NCAA Division I wrestling titles in 2004 and 2005
Don Pendleton (1927–1995), American author, creator of the Mack Bolan character
Edmund Pendleton (1721–1803), American politician, lawyer, and judge, delegate to the Continental Congress from Virginia
Edmund Henry Pendleton (1788–1862), U.S. Representative from New York
Edmund J. Pendleton (1899–1987), American composer
Ellen Fitz Pendleton (1864–1936), American college president
Florence Pendleton (1926–2020), shadow senator from the District of Columbia
Freddie Pendleton (born 1963), retired professional boxer
George Cassety Pendleton (1845–1913), Democratic politician, Texas state representative and speaker, Texas lieutenant governor, and U.S. Representative
George H. Pendleton (1825–1889), American politician, senator from Ohio, eponym of the Pendleton Civil Service Reform Act
Henry Pendleton (c. 1521 – 1557), English churchman, theologian
Isaac Pendleton (1777–1804), US sailor, captain of the brig  
Jack J. Pendleton (1918–1944), US Army soldier and WWII Medal of Honor recipient
Jim Pendleton (1924–1996), American professional baseball player
James M. Pendleton (1822–1889), U.S. Representative from Rhode Island
James Madison Pendleton (1811–1891), 19th-century Baptist preacher, educator and theologian
Joey Pendleton, Democratic member and minority whip of the Kentucky Senate
John Pendleton (1802–1868), 19th-century Virginia congressman, diplomat, lawyer and farmer
John Pendleton, Jr. (1749–1806), acting governor of Virginia in 1799
John O. Pendleton (1851–1916), U.S. Representative from West Virginia
Joseph Henry Pendleton (1860–1942), American Marine Corps general, eponym of Camp Pendleton
Karen Pendleton (born 1946), original Mickey Mouse Club Mouseketeer
Lance Pendleton (born 1983), American professional baseball player
Linwood Pendleton (born 1964), American environmental economist, acting chief economist of the National Oceanic and Atmospheric Administration (NOAA)
Louis Pendleton (1931–2007), African American dentist, businessman, and civil rights leader
Moses Pendleton (born 1949), choreographer, dancer and artistic director of dance company MOMIX
Nat Pendleton (1895–1967), American Olympic wrestler and film actor
Nathanael Pendleton (1756–1821), US lawyer and judge during the American Revolutionary War and afterward
Nathanael G. Pendleton (1793–1861), U.S. Representative from Ohio
Olga Pendleton, American statistician
Philip C. Pendleton (1779–1863), US federal judge in Virginia
Steve Pendleton (1908–1984), American film actor
Terry Pendleton (born 1960), American professional baseball player 1984–1998
Victoria Pendleton (born 1980), British track cyclist
William Frederic Pendleton (1845–1927), first executive bishop of General Church of the New Jerusalem
William N. Pendleton (1809–1883), American teacher, Episcopal priest, and Confederate general
William W. Pendleton (born 1940), former Democratic member of the Pennsylvania House of Representatives
 Treavor Pendleton, a fictional character from the 2012 video game Dishonored by Arkane Studios
 Murphy Pendleton, a fictional character and protagonist of the 2012 video game Silent Hill: Downpour

Given name:
Pendleton Murrah (1824–1865), American politician, governor of Texas during the American Civil War
Pendleton Ward (born 1982), American animator, musician, screenwriter, and producer
Edmund Pendleton Gaines (1777–1849), United States Army Major General, namesake of Fort Gaines, Alabama